The following is a list of British Army regiments that served in Australia between 1810 and 1870. From 1788 to 1790, the colony was defended by Royal Marines. From 1790 to 1810 the colony was defended by the New South Wales Corps. From 1810 to 1870, the colony was defended by British Army regiments. The Royal Marines remained in Australia until 1913, after which the Royal Australian Navy was strong enough to take full responsibility for Australian waters.

After the arrival of the First Fleet in 1788, the colony of New South Wales was initially defended by a force of three companies of marines. In 1790 this force was relieved by a specially raised corps, known as the New South Wales Corps, which provided colonial defence until 1810 when they were returned to England following the events of the Rum Rebellion. After this, regular British Army regiments were dispatched to the Australian colonies on a rotational basis, to serve as a colonial garrison for the next 60 years. The first regiment to arrive was the 73rd, who were brought to colony to replace the New South Wales Corps by Lachlan Macquarie.

The size of these forces varied over time and they were dispersed over a number geographically diverse locations, including Van Diemen's Land (later known as Tasmania), Port Phillip District (later Victoria), the Swan River Colony (later known as Western Australia), South Australia, Moreton Bay and Cape York in what later became Queensland, and Melville Island and other places in modern-day Northern Territory.  Initially the garrison was formed by only one regiment (battalion equivalent), however, in 1824 it rose to three. At its peak, in the 1840s, there were between four and six, although this fell to two in the early 1850s and then to one by the end of the decade. In the 1860s, British forces were limited to mainly garrison artillery, although a force of 15 companies of British infantry remained until 1870 when the last British regiment was withdrawn.

Ultimately, between 1810 and 1870 a total of 24 British Army infantry regiments served in Australia, along with detachments of the Royal Engineers and the Royal Artillery. No cavalry units were deployed, although detachments of infantry served as ad hoc mounted units when required. Royal Marines were also sent a number of times. The length of each regiment's service varied, with the average being around seven years. Nevertheless, some regiments, such as the 73rd and 46th served as little as three or four years, while others such as 99th served a total of 13. Two regiments, the 40th and the 50th, served two tours. The last regiment to leave was the 18th, which served the shortest tour, under a year, leaving in 1870. They were not, however, the last British troops to leave Australia. The Royal Marines remained in Australia until 1913, serving on the ships of the Royal Navy's Australia Squadron, which was based in Sydney until the Royal Australian Navy was strong enough to take full responsibility for Australian waters.

While deployed, British Army regiments undertook a variety of duties. This included guarding convict settlements, hunting down bushrangers, suppressing armed resistance by Indigenous Australians, providing security on the goldfields, assisting local police to maintain public order, undertaking ceremonial duties and developing the nation's military defences.

Regiments

See also
Colonial forces of Australia

Notes
Footnotes

Citations

References

 

 

19th-century history of the British Army
Australia
 
19th century in Australia
Australia–United Kingdom relations